Judith Walzer Leavitt (born July 22, 1940) is an American historian.

She was the Rupple Bascom and Ruth Bleier Professor of History of Medicine, History of Science, and Women's Studies at the University of Wisconsin–Madison. Her book subjects have included a study of Mary Mallon, a history of childbirth in America, and a history of public health in Milwaukee. She is the wife of Waisman Center medical director Lewis Leavitt, as well as the sister of political theorist Michael Walzer.

She is a past president of the American Association for the History of Medicine, and an elected member of the American Academy of Arts and Sciences. Leavitt received her B.A. from Antioch College in 1963, and her M.A.T., M.A., and PhD in history from the University of Chicago in 1975.

Published works 

 Make Room for Daddy: The Journey from Waiting Room to Birthing Room (Chapel Hill: University of North Carolina Press, 2009).
  "Strange young women on errands, obstetric nursing between two worlds", Nursing History Review, 6(1998): 3-24.
 Women and Health in America: Historical Readings. Second revised edition, ed. Leavitt J.W. (Madison: University of Wisconsin Press, 1999).
 Leavitt JW, Numbers RL, eds. Sickness and Health in America: Readings in the History of Medicine and Public Health (Third Edition. Madison: University of Wisconsin Press, 1997).
 "Gendered expectations: Women and early twentieth century public health". In: U.S. History as Women's History: New Feminist Essays, eds. Kerber L, Kesslar-Harris A, Sklar K.K. (Chapel Hill: University of North Carolina Press, 1995).
 Typhoid Mary: Captive to the Public's Health, (Beacon Press, 1997).
 "A worrying profession: The domestic environment of medical practice in the mid-nineteenth century". Garrison Lecture, Bulletin of the History of Medicine, 1995;69: 1-29.
 Brought to Bed: Childbearing in America 1750-1950, (Oxford University Press, 1986).
 The Healthiest City : Milwaukee and the politics of health reform, (Princeton University Press, 1982).
 Ronald L. Numbers and Judith Walzer Leavitt, eds. Wisconsin Medicine: Historical Perspectives (Madison, WI: University of Wisconsin Press, 1981).
 Guenter B. Risse, Ronald L. Numbers, and Judith Walzer Leavitt, eds. Medicine without Doctors: Home Health Care in American History (New York: Science History Publications, 1977).

References

External links
 Academic homepage, Department of History of Medicine and Bioethics
 Academic homepage, Department of the History of Science
 Article for PBS
 

1940 births
Living people
21st-century American historians
American historians of science
University of Chicago alumni
Jewish American historians
University of Wisconsin–Madison faculty
American women historians
Fellows of the American Academy of Arts and Sciences
21st-century American women writers
21st-century American Jews
Michael Walzer